An Audience and Ray Wilson is a live acoustic album by Ray Wilson released in 2006 prior to his reforming of Stiltskin. The recording comes from a live performance given by Ray Wilson on 18 May 2003 in the Agnieszka Osiecka studio of Polish Radio in Warsaw. According to the information on the sleeve, Ray Wilson "regards this performance as the best solo concert he has done to date. The concert is a fusion of stories, humour and music and is enjoyed by a very attentive and respectful Polish audience." The CD was made available exclusively through his website.

Ray has frequently stated that this is the best solo performance he has ever done.

Track listing
"Short Story"
"Another Day" (Ray Wilson)
"Short Story"
"Along The Way" (Steve Wilson)
"Short Story"
"In the Air Tonight" (Phil Collins)
"Short Story"
"Cry If You Want To" (R. Wilson)
"Short Story"
"Shipwrecked" (Tony Banks, Mike Rutherford)
"Short Story"
"Change" (R. Wilson)
"Short Story"
"Goodbye Baby Blue" (R. Wilson)
"Short Story"
"Inside" (Peter Lawlor)
"Short Story"
"Beach" (R. Wilson)
"Short Story"
"Not About Us" (Banks, Rutherford, R. Wilson)
"Short Story"
"Sarah" (R. Wilson)
"Short Story"
"The Airport Song" (R. Wilson)
"Short Story"
"Biko" (Peter Gabriel)
"Short Story"
"Heroes" (David Bowie)
"Short Story"
"Ghost" (R. Wilson)

2006 live albums
Ray Wilson (musician) albums